Bossa Antigua is an album recorded by American jazz saxophonist Paul Desmond featuring performances recorded in 1964 which were released on the RCA Victor label. The album title is a word play on bossa nova (in English, "the new thing"), the genre of Brazilian music that inspired the album. "Bossa Antigua" loosely translates in English to "old thing", though "antigua" is a Spanish word rather than Portuguese ("bossa antiga" would be a more accurate Portuguese translation of Desmond's joke). Antigua is also the name an island in the West Indies popular with North American tourists.

Context
Desmond recorded the majority of Bossa Antigua between July 28 and September 8, 1964, which coincided with the height of the popularity of bossa nova in the United States. Bossa nova had been embraced and popularized by North American musicians following the release of Stan Getz's album Jazz Samba in 1962. Other American jazz saxophonists who subsequently made bossa nova recordings include Zoot Sims, Coleman Hawkins, Gene Ammons, Cannonball Adderley and Desmond himself, with his 1963 album Take Ten. The genre's biggest chart success in the U.S. was Getz's recording of "The Girl from Ipanema", which peaked at number five in the U.S. on the Billboard Hot 100 singles chart on July 17, 1964.

Desmond would continue to incorporate Brazilian rhythms and songs into his music for the rest of his life, recording an album of Brazilian music in 1969 (From the Hot Afternoon), and the songs "Wave", "Manhã de Carnaval", and "Meditation" in 1975 with his final working group for the albums Live and the posthumous Like Someone in Love.

Reception

Allmusic awarded the album 4 stars stating " The playing is wonderful throughout, though just missing the full-throttle inspiration of Take Ten".

Track listing
All compositions by Paul Desmond except where noted.
 "Bossa Antigua" – 4:43
 "The Night Has a Thousand Eyes" (Jerry Brainin, Buddy Bernier) – 5:04
 "O Gato" (Jane Herbert) – 4:33
 "Samba Cantina" – 5:38
 "Curacao Doloroso" – 4:30
 "A Ship Without a Sail" (Richard Rodgers, Lorenz Hart) – 6:18
 "Alianca" – 4:29
 "The Girl from East 9th Street" – 6:13
 "The Night Has a Thousand Eyes" [alternate take] (Brainin, Bernier) – 7:18 Bonus track on CD reissue  
 "Samba Cepeda" – 5:06 Bonus track on CD reissue  
 "O Gato" [alternate take] – 4:53 Bonus track on CD reissue  
Recorded Webster Hall on June 13, 1964 (track 8) at RCA Studio A in New York City on July 28, 1964 (tracks 1, 4 & 10), July 29, 1964 (tracks 2, 6 & 9), August 20, 1964 (tracks 3, 5 & 11), and September 8, 1964 (track 7).

Personnel
Paul Desmond – alto saxophone
Jim Hall – guitar 
Gene Cherico (track 8), Eugene Wright (tracks 1-7 & 9–11) – bass
Connie Kay – drums

References

Paul Desmond albums
1965 albums
RCA Records albums
Albums produced by George Avakian